Ivan Gvozdenović (Serbian Cyrillic: Иван Гвозденовић; born 19 August 1978) is a Serbian retired football defender, who is the technical coach Kategoria e Parë club Skënderbeu Korçë.

Career
Gvozdenović started his career at hometown side FK Bor but later moved to Red Star Belgrade. He went on to play on loan for Radnički Pirot, Napredak Kruševac and FK Milicionar. In 1999, he returned to Red Star and played over 100 matches, before joining Belgian side Club Brugge in 2003. He spent six months at FC Metz in 2005, on loan from Club Brugge. In July 2007, Gvozdenović was released from Brugge and joined Romanian side Dinamo Bucharest in October 2007, initially signing a three-year contract. He left the team after only one month, due to a change of coach. Gvozdenović was told that he did not feature in the new coach's plans. After his short spell for Dinamo, he was transferred to Ukrainian club Metalurh Donetsk, before being released on July of the same year. In January 2009, he joined Red Star Belgrade for a second spell. On 21 August 2009, FK Vojvodina signed the experienced defensive midfielder from Red Star Belgrade for one season. He then spent the second half of the 2009–2010 season at Kavala F.C. from Greece. On 17 May 2010, the New England Revolution of Major League Soccer announced that Gvozdenović had joined the team on trial. He started for the Revs in their friendly match against Benfica on 19 May 2010. However, he did not sign with New England Revolution and went to play for KF Tirana. He declared his wish is to finish career in FK Bor, the club where he started to play football. Between 2011 and 2014 he played three seasons for Skënderbeu Korçë who won the Albanian Championship in all of those three seasons. He played for Kukësi for the 2014–2015 season, before retiring from football.

Managerial career
After two seasons in Albanian Superliga as an assistant coach of his two former clubs, Kukësi and Tirana, on 8 January 2018 he was appointed a coach of Jordan Premier League side Al-Faisaly Amman, in order to join the technical staff led by Montenegrin coach Nebojša Jovović. In July 2018 he signed for Al Mujazzal Saudi Arabia (as a head coach).

International career
His first and only cap for FR Yugoslavia is against Slovenia in a FIFA World Cup qualifying match in September 2001.

Style of play
He is a technical, attacking full-back who also plays midfield.

Honours

Club
Red Star Belgrade
 First League of FR Yugoslavia: 2000, 2001
 FR Yugoslavia Cup: 2000, 2002
Club Brugge
 Belgian Cup: 2003–04, 2006–07
 Belgian Supercup: 2003, 2004
KF Tirana
 Albanian Cup: 2010–11
Skënderbeu Korçë
 Albanian Superliga: 2011–12, 2012–13, 2013–14

References

External links

clubbrugge.be 

Profile at Srbijafudbal

1978 births
Living people
People from Bor, Serbia
Association football defenders
Serbia and Montenegro international footballers
Serbian footballers
FK Bor players
Red Star Belgrade footballers
FK Vojvodina players
FK Napredak Kruševac players
Club Brugge KV players
FC Metz players
FC Dinamo București players
FC Metalurh Donetsk players
Kavala F.C. players
KF Tirana players
KF Skënderbeu Korçë players
Serbian expatriate footballers
Expatriate footballers in Belgium
Expatriate footballers in France
Expatriate footballers in Romania
Expatriate footballers in Ukraine
Expatriate footballers in Greece
Expatriate footballers in Albania
Serbian SuperLiga players
Belgian Pro League players
Ligue 1 players
Liga I players
Ukrainian Premier League players
Kategoria Superiore players
Association football utility players
Serbia and Montenegro expatriate footballers
Serbia and Montenegro footballers
Serbia and Montenegro expatriate sportspeople in Belgium
Serbia and Montenegro expatriate sportspeople in France
Serbian expatriate sportspeople in Romania
Serbian expatriate sportspeople in Ukraine
Serbian expatriate sportspeople in Greece
Serbian expatriate sportspeople in Albania
Serbian football managers
KF Tirana managers
Expatriate football managers in Albania
Expatriate football managers in Jordan
Serbian expatriate sportspeople in Jordan
Expatriate football managers in Saudi Arabia
Serbian expatriate sportspeople in Saudi Arabia
Expatriate football managers in Romania